Passman is a surname. Notable people with the surname include:

Al Passman (1923–1984), Canadian football player
Bernard K. Passman (1916–2007), American sculptor and jeweler
Donald S. Passman (born 1940), American mathematician
George Passman Tate (1856–?), British Orientalist scholar
Otto Passman (1900–1988), American politician